The Swimming competition at the 14th Pan American Games was held August 12–18, 2003 in Santo Domingo, Dominican Republic. The competition was held in the outdoor (50m) pool of the Juan Pablo Duarte Olympic Center. It featured 32 long course (50m) events (equally split between men and women).

Two swimmers won the first medals of their countries in swimming at Pan American Games at all times: Kristel Köbrich for Chile, and Gisela Morales for Guatemala.

Results

Men's events

Women's events

Medal standings

References

 USA Swimming
 2003 Pan American Games Day 11 Results from the CBC (Swimming competition ran from Day 11-16 of the Games; link contains top-8 finishers).

 
P
Swimming at the Pan American Games
Events at the 2003 Pan American Games